The 1958 BC Lions finished the season in fifth place in the W.I.F.U. with a 3–13 record. 

Head coach Clem Crowe was fired after an 0–5 start to the season and his replacement, former star end Dan Edwards, didn't fare much better, losing his first five games before finally recording a win in a game versus Calgary.  All-star guard and linebacker Ed Sharkey on played only five games after sustaining what would be a career-ending neck injury.

After the season, Dan Edwards was fired and Winnipeg assistant Wayne Robinson was hired on December 6 to be the fourth head coach in Lions history.

Even with such a dismal start to the season, the Lions averaged 23,647 fans per game. On a stranger note, the Lions schedule was exactly the same as that of the previous season.

Rookie offensive lineman Tom Hinton was the lone Western all-star for the Lions.

Regular season

Season standings

Season schedule

Offensive leaders

1958 CFL Awards
None

References

BC Lions seasons
1958 Canadian Football League season by team
1958 in British Columbia